Skippy Adelman (born Julius Edelman; March 29, 1924 Manhattan, New York City – May 1, 2004 Long Island City, New York) was an American photographer, best known for his book Jazzways, featuring monochrome photography of jazz musicians, and for his contributions to the bygone New York City daily paper, PM, where he worked as a staff photojournalist.

Adelman also worked as a stringer for Black Star and contributed photos to Ebony from 1946 to 1955 and New York Age around 1950. Adelman stopped photographing jazz musicians in the late 1940s and seemingly disappeared, perhaps because he began using his real name in 1953.

Personal life 
Julius Edelman's mother, Bessie Cohen (1896–1924), died 3 months after he was born. His father, Harry Edelman (1892–1992), a Romanian-born furrier in Manhattan, remarried on June 29, 1929, to Mary (born in Riga, Latvia, as Mera Weinberg; 1900–1993). Mary immigrated to the United States on July 3, 1923, and became a naturalized U.S. citizen on November 18, 1935. Edelman graduated from Stuyvesant High School in June 1941. Stuyvesant, then located in the Stuyvesant Square Neighborhood, was about 1.7 miles from his family's apartment on the southern border of the East Village, at 488 East Houston. In 1942, Adelman lived at 331 East 12th Street in the East Village.

Edelman was married to Dorothy R. Langer (1925–2021) for 57 years, until his death. Dorothy died shortly after and was buried next to him at the New Montefiore Cemetery, West Babylon, Long Island, New York.

Career 
Adelman was a staff photojournalist at the New York City paper PM. He also contributed his photographic works to other publications such as Black Starr, Ebony and New York Age. Adelman began using his real name professionally in 1953.

From 1948 through 1952, Adelman wrote at least 24 short pulp magazine works (also under the name Skippy Adelman) that were published by the Chicago-based publisher Popular Publications. He wrote the music and lyrics for six songs and co-composed five more from 1952 through 1953 using the pseudonym Jack Smiles. He had a one-time acting role as a mannequin factory owner in Stanley Kubrick's 1955 film, Killer's Kiss, in which he was credited as Julius Adelman.  Sometime before 1962, Edelman became a member of the Screen Directors International Guild, which merged with the Directors Guild of America in 1965.

As Julius Edelman, he went on to become an executive in various film production and advertising agencies, including:
 Executive Vice-President in Charge of Production (after a promotion from Assistant Film Editor in 1953) of Peter Elgar Productions, Inc. from 1953–1960. 
 Production Group Supervisor for Ted Bates until about June 1963.
 Cowriter with Paul Mazursky of a teleplay episode for The Rifleman (aired March 12, 1962) – "Tinhorn" (Season 4, Episode 24; Overall Episode No. 134), directed by Lawrence Dobkin.
 Vice-President, producer, and Director for Mickey Schwartz Productions, Inc., which produced films for TV beginning around June 1963.
 Vice President & Executive Producer for Allegro Film Productions, Inc., from as early as 1965 to at least 1986, which produced of TV commercials. The company was also known for its short scholastic-oriented science films, such as the Science Screen Report (trademarked filed October 20, 1971). Allegro Film was a subsidiary of Sterling Communications, a forerunner to HBO.

Disappearance 
Adelman seemingly disappeared, perhaps because he began using his real name in 1953. In 1972, Popular Photography columnist Simon Nathan wrote that if he were given one hundred mythical dollars – 2nd on his list of 26 things to do – he would "have 1,666 six-cent postcards printed and write the whole world to try to find out whatever became of Skippy Adelman, the great photographer from the newspaper PM."

Critical acclaim 

 In 2021, author Alan John Ainsworth wrote, "Few photographers were closer to the world of the 1930s and 1940s jazz than Charles Peterson and Skippy Adelman... Adelman, a Greenwich Village resident and one of a new generation of hard-bitten photojournalists, was as close as Peterson had been in midtown Manhattan to the swirl of activities around Condon... Adelman belonged chronologically to the new generation cohort but his life and work caution against pigeonholing all these photographers as young, college-educated members of the middle class."
 According to newspaper jazz columnist Nels Nelson (paraphrasing), "Skippy Adelman begat Otto Hess, who begat Charles Peterson, who begat Popsy Randolph, who begat Herman Leonard, who begat Chuck Stewart, who begat Robert Parent, who begat Burt Goldblatt, who begat Robert Polillo."

Books

 Cover design by Paul Rand. More than 100 photos by Skippy Adelman, Bernice Abbott, and Sargent John Marsh (1916–2003).

Selected Articles 

 Cincinnati: Jazzways (1946). ; ; .
 New York City: Greenberg (1946, 1947). ; ; .
 London: Musicians Press Ltd. (1947). .
   The book includes 78 photos of jazz musicians. The photographers include Skippy Adelman, William Claxton, Bill Gottlieb, Otto F. Hess, Herman Leonard, and Francis Wolff.
Criticism – directed towards Anderson, Condon's publicist, and Esquire – for publishing what seemed like a promo-piece for Condon was so severe that this issue stood as Esquire's last annual poll on jazz.

References

Further reading

Books, journals, magazines, and papers 

  ; .

 
  ; .

  .

 

  ; .Note: Mathieu was the founder of Minicam Photography
 

  , ; ; .
  .
 
 

   & ; .

 

 ; ; .Aaron Maximillion Mathieu (1907–1996), founder of Minicam Photography, was the publication's business manager.

News media 

    (US Newsstream database).
   (US Newsstream database).

Genealogical archives and government documents 

 
<li> 
<li> 
<li> 
<li> 
 The ONLO Association is a benevolent cemetery association of the Onward Lodge #487, Knights of Pythias of New York City.

 

 Digital source → NARA digital publication T627 → Digital image 2 (of 18). Records of the Bureau of the Census, 1790–2007. RG (record group) No 29. Washington, D.C.: National Archives and Records Administration (2012). Roll 2635.

External links 
 Philippa Schuyler Portrait Collection, New York Public Library. External link → .

1924 births
2004 deaths
20th-century American photographers
Jazz photographers
American photojournalists
Stuyvesant High School alumni
Social documentary photographers
Burials at New Montefiore Cemetery